Hypercompe neurophylla is a moth of the family Erebidae first described by Francis Walker in 1856. It is found in Venezuela and Ecuador.

References

Hypercompe
Moths described in 1856